Rotala rotundifolia, the dwarf rotala, is a plant species often confused with Rotala indica. It is sold in the aquarium trade, but is of uncertain status.

It is a common weed in rice paddies and wet places in India, China, Taiwan, Thailand, Laos, and Vietnam, and has been introduced to the United States.

Description
The emerse form has rounded leaves, the submerse leaves are narrow lanceolate. It is very variable dependent on light and environmental conditions. Under strong light, the leaves can become almost wine red. It has pale pink flowers.
This plant can be differentiated from the closely related R. indica by the differences in the two species' inflorescences. R. rotundifolia bears groups of terminal inflorescence, while R. indica has solitary flowers on the axis of the leaves.

Cultivation
A common aquarium plant, it is undemanding, but requires light to thrive. R. rotundifolia can withstand relatively cool temperatures. Losing its lower leaves usually means it is not receiving enough light. It can be grown emerse in shallow water, where it will flower. It is propagated by cuttings which form as side shoots.

References

 Cook. C.D.K. 1976. A revision of the genus Rotala.  Boissiera 29:1-156.

External links
 Tropica
 AquaHobby
 US introduction
 Plant Geek - illustrated
 sp Green

rotundifolia
Freshwater plants